Bangalore Muslims Football Club is an professional football club based in Bangalore, Karnataka, that emerged as one of the strongest football teams during the 1930s, 40s and 50s.

History
Bangalore Muslims became the first Indian club to win Rovers Cup in 1937, the second oldest football tournament in India, defeating Mohammedan SC 1–0 in the final. The club again emerged champions winning the title in 1938, becoming the first civilian team to defeat a British regimental side in the final. In that edition, they defeated the Argyll and Scottish Highlanders by 3–2. Veteran players like Mohammad Abdus Sattar,

In 1941, the club clinched Stafford Challenge Cup title and became first Indian club to do so. Ahmed Khan, Mariappa Kempaiah have played for the club. It was Bangalore Muslims that challenged the hegemony of Hyderabad City Police achieving success continuously as a non-Kolkata club.

In the 1960s, the trust that ran the team sold its share of the club to Mumtaz Ali Khan whose trust, the Al-Ameen trust took over the club. During the 1960s and 1970s, domestic football in Bangalore was dominated by the PSU teams such as Hindustan Aeronautics Limited (HAL), Indian Telephone Industries (ITI), Electronic Radar Development Establishment (ERDE) and thus drew over the talent from the rest of the clubs. This lead to the decline of the football clubs in Bangalore, which also affected Bangalore Muslims.

The team continues to exist in the lower divisions of the Bangalore Football League. It participates in the Bangalore District Football Association C Division Championship. The Al-Ameen college football team also participates as the Bangalore Muslims team.

Honours
Rovers Cup
Champions (3): 1937, 1938, 1948
Runners-up (2): 1940, 1953
Stafford Challenge Cup
Champions: 1941

See also
 List of football clubs in India
 History of Indian football

References

Further reading

Football clubs in Bangalore
Organizations with year of establishment missing
Organizations with year of disestablishment missing